Ron Simonson (born March 12, 1942) is a former American football coach.  He served as the head football coach at the University of Puget Sound from 1978 to 1984 and at the University of Northern Colorado from 1985 until 1988, compiling a career college football record of 66–48–1.  He also held assistant coaching positions with the Winnipeg Blue Bombers of the Canadian Football League (CFL) and Oregon State.

After retiring from football he began a career as an author.

Head coaching record

References

1942 births
Living people
Northern Colorado Bears football coaches
Oregon State Beavers football coaches
Portland State Vikings football players
Puget Sound Loggers football coaches
Winnipeg Blue Bombers coaches
Sportspeople from Portland, Oregon
Players of American football from Portland, Oregon